Doctor Innocentanu is a 2012 Indian Malayalam-language comedy film written and directed by Ajmal, and starring Innocent and Sona Nair in the lead roles. The film is inspired from Guy de Maupassant's English short story The Necklace.

Plot
Doctor Innocentanu is the story of Homeopathic Doctor Bargavan Pillai, who always helps poor patients. His wife Subha lakshmi is unhappy that her husband is not earning a lot to lead a financially healthy life. For the Panchayat elections, one political party approaches Bargavan Pillai to contest on behalf of them. Though he was reluctant, his relents when his wife persuades him. But Doctor does not win the elections, despite a strong campaign.

Bargavan Pillai's longtime friend Dr. James invites them for his daughter's wedding. Subha Lakshmi complaints that the family do not have good dresses to wear for the wedding. Bargavan Pillai goes to a pawn broker and takes money instead of his beloved scooter. His family becomes excited when they get new dress but now Subha Lakshmi complaints that they do not have enough ornaments. On her advice, Doctor goes to his neighbor Vasudevan and borrows his wife's costly necklace for a day. But Subha Lakshmi loses the ornament during the marriage. Doctor buys a new ornament from a Jewellery shop by promising that he will pay the money in a few days and gives it to Vasudevan.

Dr James comes to Bargavan Pillai's home to say that he got the ornament back from the garden. Bargavan Pillai goes to the jewellery shop to give the ornament back and clear the debt. But they find that the ornament is only gold plated. Bargavan Pillai comes to Vasudevan's house only to see that Vasudevan has been arrested by police for similar frauds. Bargavan Pillai also discovers that the politicians who stood with him during the elections had taken loan from a bank using Bargavan Pillai's signature.

Since Bargavan Pillai hadn't repaid the loan for a long time, Bank decides to seize his house. But during the court proceedings of sealing his house, Anna comes to the scene. She was brought up at the orphanage where Bargavan Pillai provided free service for years. Anna says she is alive only because of the medicines Bargavan Pillai send her. Anna promises to clear off his debts and all ends well.

Cast

References

External links
 

2010s Malayalam-language films
Indian comedy films
Films shot in Palakkad
2012 comedy films
2012 films